Acme Oyster House is a seafood restaurant in the French Quarter of New Orleans. Their food is served Cajun and Creole style and they have locations in Florida, Alabama and Texas.

History
Acme was founded in 1910 as the Acme Café.

In popular culture
Acme appeared in Man v. Food (season 1).  Adam Richman’s challenge was to join the 15 Dozen Club. They also appeared on Food Paradise (season 2).

References

Seafood restaurants in Louisiana
Restaurants in New Orleans
French Quarter